The 2019 UT Martin Skyhawks baseball team represents the University of Tennessee at Martin during the 2019 NCAA Division I baseball season. The Skyhawks, led by Second-year head coach Ryan Jenkins, play their home games at Skyhawk Park as members of the Ohio Valley Conference.

Schedule and results

References

UT Martin Skyhawks
UT Martin Skyhawks baseball seasons
Tennessee Martin